John Robert Landon (March 7, 1950 – July 29, 2021) was an American politician who served in the Iowa House of Representatives from the 37th district from 2013 to 2021. A Republican, Landon was born in State Center, Iowa and resided in Ankeny, Iowa. He had a B.S. in agriculture from Iowa State University.

, Landon served on several committees in the Iowa House – the Commerce, Human Resources, and Transportation committees. He also served as the vice chair of the Ways and Means committee and as a member of the Capitals Appropriations Subcommittee.

He died from cancer while still in office on July 29, 2021, at the age of 71.

Electoral history
*incumbent

Notes

References

External links

 Representative John Landon official Iowa General Assembly site
 
 Financial information (state office) at the National Institute for Money in State Politics

1950 births
2021 deaths
Iowa State University alumni
Republican Party members of the Iowa House of Representatives
People from Ankeny, Iowa
People from Marshall County, Iowa
21st-century American politicians